The Trouble with Miss Switch is a 1980 animated television special produced by Ruby-Spears Productions and based on the 1971 children's book of the same name by Barbara Brooks Wallace. It originally aired in two parts on ABC Weekend Special series on February 16 and 23, 1980.

Following its initial broadcast, Miss Switch was frequently rerun and due to its popularity, a sequel called Miss Switch to the Rescue was also produced as an ABC Weekend Special in 1982.

Synopsis
Rupert Brown and Amelia Daley are classmates at Pepperdine Elementary School who discover that their substitute teacher, Miss Switch, is a witch complete with a magical talking Lykoi-Breed cat named Bathsheba. She tells the children that the wicked witch Saturna has taken control of the Witches' Council and has condemned the fair Miss Switch with the aid of her Compute-O-Witch. Rupert suggests bewitching a certain football player's number at the big game to ensure victory, but Saturna causes the spell to backfire so that the visiting team wins. Rupert comes up with another plan, but asks Miss Switch to let him and Amelia accompany her.

Miss Switch and Bathsheba fly to Witch Mountain with Rupert and Amelia. Saturna sends out her bats to attack them, which causes the broom to splinter; some bats carry Miss Switch away, while the others drop Rupert, Amelia and Bathsheba down a well. Miss Switch finds herself in the council room, where the Witches' Council prepares their verdict. The children and Bathsheba get out of the well, and sneak in disguised as witches. Just as Miss Switch agrees to be banished, her friends reveal that her ability to spread love and joy is the most original witchcraft idea of all. After the Compute-O-Witch explodes from Rupert and Amelia’s speech, the Witches' Council banishes Saturna and appoints Miss Switch the new Head Witch. The next day, Miss Switch tells the kids that she’s to return to Witch Mountain as she says goodbye to Rupert and Amelia.

Voices
 Janet Waldo – Miss Switch
 Eric Taslitz – Rupert Brown
 Nancy McKeon – Amelia Daley
 June Foray – Bathsheba and Saturna
 Frank Welker—Guinea Pig
 Philip Tanzini – Banana
 Alan Dinehart – Hector

Production credits
Executive Producers: Joe Ruby & Ken Spears
Produced by: Jerry Eisenberg
Directed by: Charles A. Nichols
Written by: Sheldon Stark
From the Book by: Barbara Brooks Wallace
Voices: Janet Waldo, Eric Taslitz, Nancy McKeon, June Foray, Frank Welker, Philip Tanzini, Alan Dinehart
Story Direction: Ron Campbell
Character Design: Allan Huck, Alice Hamm, Edgar Soller
Voice Direction: Alan Dinehart
Layout Supervisor: Larry Huber
Unit Supervisor: David High
Layout: John Freeman, Bob Givens, John F. Guerin, Floyd Norman, Wallace Sides, Bart Seitz, Lin Larsen, Pat Wong
Production Manager: Warren Marshall
Layout: Lyle Beddes, Stuart Heimdal, Elaine Hultgren, Boyd Kirland, Brad Landreth, Debra Pugh, Keith Sargent, Roy Smith, Grant Wilson 
Animation Supervisor: Ed Solomon
Animation: Steve Clark, Jim Davis, Daniel De La Vega, Frank Gonzales, John Howley, Bill Hutten, Tony Love, Norm McCabe, Frank Nakielski, Don Orlando, Don Parmele, Bill Pratt, Virgil Raddatz, Bill Reed, Joe Roman, Joanna Romersa, John Shook, Mike Stribling, Marty Taras
Backgrounds Painted by: Gary Conklin, Bill Lorencz, P.S. Lewis, Michele Moen, Phil Phillipson, Gary Selvaggio, Peter Van Elk, Thomas Woodington, Gloria Wood 
Production Manager: John Ahern
Titles: Bob Schaefer
Music: Dean Elliott

Home video release
The Trouble with Miss Switch was released on a VHS titled The Miss Switch Mystery Special as a double feature with Miss Switch to the Rescue by Strand VCI Entertainment in 1991. To date, it has not been released on DVD by current rightsholder Warner Home Video.

See also
 Miss Switch to the Rescue
 List of Ruby-Spears productions
 ABC Weekend Special

References

External links
 
 
 

1980 television specials
1980s American animated films
1980s American television specials
1980s animated television specials
ABC Weekend Special
American Broadcasting Company television specials
Films directed by Charles August Nichols
Films scored by Dean Elliott
Television series about witchcraft
Ruby-Spears television specials
Television shows based on children's books